Jenny Schumacher (10 September 1921 – November 2003) was a Belgian gymnast. She competed in the women's artistic team all-around at the 1948 Summer Olympics.

References

1921 births
2003 deaths
Belgian female artistic gymnasts
Olympic gymnasts of Belgium
Gymnasts at the 1948 Summer Olympics
Sportspeople from Liège